Joseph Thomas Corrigan (born 18 November 1948) is an English former professional footballer who played as a goalkeeper in the Football League for Manchester City, Brighton & Hove Albion, Norwich City and Stoke City as well as the England national team.

Corrigan began his career at Manchester City making his professional debut in 1967. In the 1969–70 season, he established himself as the first choice 'keeper at Maine Road, taking over from the ageing Harry Dowd. He spent 16 seasons at Manchester City, winning the UEFA Cup Winners' Cup and League Cup twice, while also earning nine England caps. He left in 1983 to play for the North American Soccer League's Seattle Sounders, then returned to England for spells with Brighton & Hove Albion, Norwich City and Stoke City. A neck injury forced him to retire in 1985.

Playing career
Corrigan joined Manchester City as a youth player in 1966. He made his debut in 1967, in a League Cup match against Blackpool. Corrigan was an understudy to Harry Dowd in City's 1969 FA Cup win. Corrigan then established himself in the first team during the 1969–70 season, and was part of the Manchester City team which won a cup double of the UEFA European Cup Winners Cup and the League Cup. He was also a member of the 1976 League Cup winning side. His debut appearance for England came on 28 May 1976 against Italy, the first of a total of 9 caps, and he was part of the England squad for the 1982 FIFA World Cup. He would undoubtedly have played more time for England if his chances had not been limited by Peter Shilton and Ray Clemence. Corrigan also appeared for Manchester City in the 1981 FA Cup Final defeat by Tottenham Hotspur where he was named as man-of-the match. In total Corrigan made 592 appearances for Manchester City, a figure beaten only by Alan Oakes, and a club record for a goalkeeper. He also won Manchester City's Player of the Year award three times, a feat matched only by Richard Dunne. He is remembered as one of Manchester City's best goalkeepers along with Frank Swift and Bert Trautmann.

Corrigan was sold in 1983 to American club Seattle Sounders for £30,000. Corrigan stayed in the US only a few months, making 29 appearances before returning to England with Brighton. At the end of his career he also had spells on loan at Stoke City and Norwich.

Coaching career
After retiring from football, Joe Corrigan was the Goalkeeping Coach at Liverpool from 1994 until the arrival of Rafael Benítez in 2004. On 21 September 2004, Corrigan joined the coaching team at Chester City but moved to become goalkeeping coach at Stockport County on 5 October 2004. In February 2005, Corrigan joined West Bromwich Albion. Joe Corrigan retired at the end of the 2008–09 season.

In February 2011 Corrigan came out of retirement to join Hull City as goalkeeping coach, replacing Mark Prudhoe, who had been criticised by some Hull supporters for his coaching methods. Corrigan left his coaching role at Hull City in August 2011 after being involved in an unspecified incident with Jimmy Bullard on a pre season trip to Slovenia, the latter being sacked as a result.

Honours
Manchester City
 UEFA Cup Winners' Cup: 1970
 Football League Cup: 1970, 1976
 FA Charity Shield: 1972

Individual
 Manchester City Player of the Year: 1976, 1978, 1980

Career statistics

Club

International

References

External links
 Seattle Sounders stats
 Career information at ex-canaries.co.uk
 
 

English footballers
Association football goalkeepers
England international footballers
England under-23 international footballers
England under-21 international footballers
England B international footballers
English expatriate footballers
Manchester City F.C. players
Brighton & Hove Albion F.C. players
Norwich City F.C. players
Stoke City F.C. players
Seattle Sounders (1974–1983) players
North American Soccer League (1968–1984) players
UEFA Euro 1980 players
1982 FIFA World Cup players
Liverpool F.C. non-playing staff
1948 births
Living people
West Bromwich Albion F.C. non-playing staff
English Football League players
Chester City F.C. non-playing staff
Stockport County F.C. non-playing staff 
Footballers from Manchester
Hull City A.F.C. non-playing staff
English expatriate sportspeople in the United States
Expatriate soccer players in the United States
FA Cup Final players
Association football goalkeeping coaches